Von morgens bis mitternachts is an expressionist play written by the German dramatist Georg Kaiser in 1912, but banned for reasons which were not entirely clear, being neither immoral nor anarchistic, then in 1917 produced by the Austrian Max Reinhardt.

It was translated for the English stage as From Morn to Midnight: A Play in Seven Scenes by Ashley Dukes, and produced by the Stage Society to negative reviews.

A modern translation by Dennis Kelly was titled From Morning to Midnight.

Major characters
Clerk
Italian Lady
Mother, at the Clerk's home
2 Daughters, also at the Clerk's home
Harlequin, who appears in the brothel scene
Penitent Cyclist, who speaks during the Salvation Army meeting
Salvation Army Officer, who makes a speech at the meeting
Salvation Amy girl, who appears in a number of scenes.

Production history
Although written in 1912, From Morning to Midnight was not staged until 1917, due to censorship by German authorities about its portrayal of the Kaiser.

In 2013, the play was staged at the National Theatre in London, with a cast including:

Adam Godley – Clerk
Gina Bellman – Italian Lady/Salvation Army Officer
Eva Magyar – Mother
Victoria Moseley and Emily Mytton – Daughters
Victoria Moseley – Harlequin
Esh Alladi – Penitent Cyclist
Katherine Manners -Salvation Amy girl

Adaptation
In 1920, a film version of the play, From Morn to Midnight was directed by Karlheinz Martin. In 2001, an opera by David Sawer based on the play, and also entitled From Morning to Midnight, was produced by English National Opera.

References

1912 plays
German plays adapted into films
Expressionist plays